2DTV is a British satirical animated television series which was co-created and produced by Giles Pilbrow for ITV. It premiered on ITV1 on 14 October 2001 and was nominated for the Rose d'Or Award in both 2002 and 2003.

The programme was considered the spiritual successor of Spitting Image, a 1980s series that also featured work by Pilbrow. The show's style also paid homage to the animation studio Hanna-Barbera. The voice cast included Jon Culshaw, Jan Ravens and Mark Perry. 2DTV ran for five series before being cancelled in 2004 due to falling viewing figures. It was succeeded in 2008 by the short-lived series Headcases.

Background
2DTV employed the same satirical style as Spitting Image but used animation rather than puppets. The animation was produced using computer graphics, frequently with animators working up to the day of broadcast. The producer, Giles Pilbrow, was a veteran of Spitting Image, as were some of the show's voice artists.

The series was directed by Tim Searle. 2DTV was first broadcast in 2001, but an un-broadcast pilot episode was recorded nearly six months earlier. The pilot episode featured the resident newsreader played by Alistair McGowan, but the character was not carried over when the full seven-part first series was commissioned by ITV. Each episode in the first series lasted ten minutes.

A second seven-episode series began broadcasting in 2002, with each episode again lasting ten minutes. The series spawned its own official single in July 2002, Shoot the Dog, performed by George Michael. The music video features an animated Michael plus several other characters from 2DTV performing the song.

A commercial for the home media compilation The Best of 2DTV was banned by the Broadcast Advertising Clearance Centre in 2002. The commercial depicted George W. Bush taking one VHS out of its case and putting it in his toaster. Ofcom stated that advertisements for products cannot appear to be endorsed by someone without their permission – in this case, George W. Bush. The original advert was reworked into a sketch in which Bush writes a letter complaining about being portrayed as a moron by the media, then proceeding to “post” the letter in his toaster. The programme creators subsequently proposed another commercial, this time satirising Osama Bin Laden, but they were informed that this would also be banned on the grounds that Bin Laden would have to give permission for his image to be used.

Another commercial satirised David Beckham compiling his list for Christmas, asking his wife; “how do you spell DVD?”. A ban was later overturned on the grounds that the commercial was legitimate satire and the commercial was shown unedited. The programme's creators claimed that the controversy generated more interest in the show than the adverts could ever have done alone.

For the third series, each episode was extended to 20 minutes, including advertisements. After the third series, many of the original cast members, including Jon Culshaw, Jan Ravens and Mark Perry, decided to leave following an announcement that the fourth series would be extended to 30 minutes per episode. New cast members Lewis MacLeod, Kate O'Sullivan and Enn Reitel took over, appearing alongside the only remaining original cast member, Dave Lamb. All four returned for the fifth series in 2004 but due to falling ratings its broadcast was placed in the so-called graveyard slot and the show was officially cancelled at the end of that year.

Cast

Series 1–3
 Jon Culshaw – providing impressions of Tony Blair, Jack Straw, William Hague, John Major, George W. Bush, George H. W. Bush, Prince Charles, Angus Deayton, Ian Hislop, Paul Merton, Gareth Gates, Chris Eubank, Rolf Harris, Trevor McDonald, George Michael, David Beckham, Gregory Hines, Ed Catmul, Michael Jackson, Johnny Vegas, Steve Irwin, Lawrence Llewelyn-Bowen, Uri Geller, Bill Gates, Liam Gallagher, Anthony McPartlin, Lyle Lovett, Matt Groening, Sven-Göran Eriksson, Bill Murray, Dennis Quaid, John Lasseter, Michael Keaton, Roy Keane, Denzel Washington, Michael Owen, Tommy Vercetti, Pete Docter, Alex Ferguson, Steve Jobs, Ozzy Osbourne, Guy Ritchie, Iain Duncan Smith, Richard Madeley, Tiff Needell, Richard Gere, Phillip Schofield, Tim Henman, Quentin Willson, Tim Meadows, Matt Dillon, Jon Lovitz, Brendan Fraser
 Jan Ravens – providing impressions of Cherie Blair, Ann Widdecombe, Queen Elizabeth, Camilla Parker Bowles, Princess Anne, Fergie, Geri Halliwell, Victoria Beckham, Anne Robinson, Jordan, Angelina Jolie, Heather Graham, Natasha Kaplinsky, Erin Brockovich, Amy Adams, Björk, Wendy Wilson, Carol “Smiley” Smillie, Natasha Richardson, Jennifer Lopez, Lindsay Lohan, Rita Wilson, Anna Chlumsky, Kate Middleton, Madonna, Davina McCall, Michelle Pfeiffer, Kylie Minogue, Sharon Osbourne, Elizabeth Perkins, Kelly Osbourne, Jade Goody, Andie MacDowell, Kim Woodburn, Aggie MacKenzie, Nigella Lawson, Dina Lohan, Jamie Lee Curtis, Queen Mother, Judy Finnigan, Angelina Jolie, Sandra Bullock, Daryl Hannah, Sally Field, Vanessa Paradis, Kate Hudson, Diane Keaton, Kate Beckinsale, Claudia Winkleman
 Mark Perry – providing impressions of Gordon Brown, Robin Cook, Lee Unkrich, Steve Harvey, Dave Thomas, Luiz Felipe Scolari, Keanu Reeves, Saddam Hussein, Jerry Seinfeld, Patrick Bergin, Hugh Laurie, Jason Alexander, Ben Affleck, Willem Dafoe, Bruce Arena, Spider-Man, Michael Howard, Dave Benson Phillips, Keith Wickham, Steve Wright, John Candy, Michael Parkinson, Graham Norton, Matt Damon, Glenn Hoddle, Pierce Brosnan, Gary Haisman, Steve McClaren
 Terry Klassen – additional voices

Series 4–5
 Enn Reitel – providing impressions of Tony Blair, Jack Straw, Cuba Gooding Jr., John Prescott, Breckin Meyer, Lyle Lovett, Michael Jackson, Johnny Vegas, Ben Affleck, Jamie Foxx, Anthony McPartlin, Jeremy Clarkson, Michael Howard, John Landis, Will Young, Cuba Gooding Sr., Tom Cruise, George Clooney, Tim Henman, Justin Hawkins, Simon Cowell, Jack Osbourne, Bill Cosby, James Earl Jones, Eddie Murphy, Jacques Chirac, Phil Spencer, Jared Fogle, Gordon Ramsay, Bertie Ahern, David Dimbleby, Peter Andre, Frank Skinner, Des Lynam, Robbie Williams, Gareth Gates, Lawrence Llewelyn-Bowen, Uri Geller, David Blunkett, Charles Kennedy, Liam Neeson, Hugh Laurie, Dick Cheney, Jay Leno, Arnold Schwarzenegger, Conan O'Brien, Prince Philip, Tom Hanks, Prince Edward, Princes William and Harry, Rowan Atkinson, Tim Allen, Brad Pitt, Osama Bin Laden, Pope John Paul II
 Kate O'Sullivan – providing impressions of Cherie Blair, Queen Elizabeth, Camilla Parker Bowles, Julia Roberts, Princess Anne, Geri Halliwell, Victoria Beckham, Anne Robinson, Jordan, Carol “Smiley” Smillie, Natalie Imbruglia, Jennifer Lopez, Madonna, Tina Fey, Emma Roberts, Davina McCall, Kylie Minogue, Sharon Osbourne, Kelly Osbourne, Elizabeth Hurley, Kim Woodburn, Nigella Lawson, Kirstie Allsopp, Jennifer Garner, Aggie MacKenzie, Trinny Woodall, Lisa Ann Walter, Jennifer Love Hewitt, Renée Zellweger, Susannah Constantine, Judy Finnigan, Andre Agassi, Jamie Lee Curtis, Angelina Jolie, Steffi Graf, Helena Bonham Carter, Elaine Hendrix, Sophie Ellis-Bextor, Missi Pyle, Judi Dench, Rita Wilson, Coleen McLoughlin, Kate Winslet, Sally Kellerman
 Lewis MacLeod – providing impressions of Gordon Brown, Chris Eubank, Rolf Harris, Lee Unkrich, Arsenio Hall, George Michael, Richard Gere, David Beckham, Richard Pryor, George W. Bush, Dave Thomas, Prince Charles, John Candy, Trevor McDonald, Steve Irwin, Uri Geller, Bill Gates, Michael Lohan, Richard Fairbrass, Liam Gallagher, Sven-Göran Eriksson, Roy Keane, Paddy Ashdown, Michael Owen, Alex Ferguson, Ozzy Osbourne, Johnny Vaughan, Richard Madeley, Steve Martin, Louis Walsh, Wayne Rooney, Rio Ferdinand, Paul Scholes, David Seaman, Neil Armstrong, Kim Jong-il, Chevy Chase, Guy Ritchie, Robin Cook, Saddam Hussein, Declan Donnelly, Ronaldo, Phil Neville, Boris Johnson, Daniel Moder, Jeffrey Katzenberg, Wayne Rooney, Patrick Warburton, Eric Roberts, Dan Aykroyd, Forrest Gump

All Series
 Dave Lamb – providing impressions of John Prescott, David Blunkett, Stephen Byers, Paul Giamatti, Michael Portillo, Charles Kennedy, Dick Cheney, Arnold Schwarzenegger, Prince Philip, Prince Edward, Richard Pryor, Princes William and Harry, Osama Bin Laden, Pope John Paul II, Elton John, Graham Norton, Andrew Marr, Michael Palin, Declan Donnelly, Martin Keown, Robin Williams, Paul Gleason, Ronaldo, Phil Neville, Tom Cruise.

References

External links

 

2001 British television series debuts
2004 British television series endings
2000s British animated comedy television series
2000s British satirical television series
British adult animated comedy television series
Animated satirical television series
English-language television shows
ITV sketch shows
Cultural depictions of David Beckham
Cultural depictions of Osama bin Laden
Cultural depictions of Tony Blair
Cultural depictions of Gordon Brown
Cultural depictions of George W. Bush
Cultural depictions of George H. W. Bush
Cultural depictions of Elizabeth II
Cultural depictions of Bill Gates
Cultural depictions of Saddam Hussein
Cultural depictions of Michael Jackson
Cultural depictions of Madonna
Cultural depictions of Charles III
Cultural depictions of Arnold Schwarzenegger
Cultural depictions of Pope John Paul II
Cultural depictions of Andre Agassi
Cultural depictions of Tom Cruise
Cultural depictions of Dick Cheney
Cultural depictions of Boris Johnson
Cultural depictions of politicians
Cultural depictions of sportspeople
Cultural depictions of actors
Cultural depictions of presenters
Cultural depictions of pop musicians
Cultural depictions of religious leaders